Cyclopentyne is a cycloalkyne containing five carbon atoms in the ring. Due to the ideal bond angle of 180° at each atom of the alkyne but the structural requirement that the bonds form a ring, this chemical is a highly strained structure, and the triple bond is highly reactive. The triple bond easily undergoes both [2+2] and [4+2] cycloaddition reactions. Unlike benzyne, which undergoes a [2+2] addition with loss of stereochemistry at the alkene partner, cyclopentyne reacts with alkenes with retention of geometry of the partner, an example of the relevance of orbital symmetry even for highly reactive structures. The structure can also form a π complex with lithium cations, which affects the cycloaddition reactivity. It can even interact strongly enough with copper species to form a novel type of metallacycle.

References 

Reactive intermediates
Alkynes
Five-membered rings
Hydrocarbons